Indian cold wave during the winter months of 2012 killed at least 92 people across northern and eastern India. The drop in temperature had a devastating effect on the hundreds of thousands of homeless people in India.

Most of the dead were homeless and elderly people, living in the state of Uttar Pradesh. Other northern and eastern states such as Rajasthan, Punjab, Haryana, New Delhi, Jammu and Kashmir, Himachal Pradesh, Madhya Pradesh, Bihar and Tripura  were also affected by this cold snap. New Delhi was also gripped by cold weather, with the temperature dipping to 7 °C on the Christmas Day and 1 °C after New Year.

See also
 Cold wave
 Climate of India

References 

2012 cold waves
Cold waves in Asia
2012 in Asia
2012 disasters in India
Natural disasters in India